Medvezhy Vzvoz is a rural locality (a village) in Orlovskoye Rural Settlement, Velikoustyugsky District, Vologda Oblast, Russia. The population was 7 as of 2002.

Geography 
Medvezhy Vzvoz is located 63 km southeast of Veliky Ustyug (the district's administrative centre) by road. Smolinskoye is the nearest rural locality.

References 

Rural localities in Velikoustyugsky District